Jamia Uloom-ul-Islamia (Jāmi‘ah ‘Ulūm-i Islāmīyah / , Jāmi‘atul-‘Ulūmul-Islāmīyah) is an Islamic University in Banoori Town, Karachi, Pakistan. The university continues the tradition of the Darul Uloom system initiated by Darul Uloom Deoband. , there are about twelve thousand students in different departments of the Jamiah and its branches, including a number of foreign students from over sixty countries.

Controversies

Assassinations of preachers
On 2 November 1997, two scholars at Jamiat-ul-Uloom-ul-Islamia, Habibullah Mukhtar (Rector) and Abdus Sami, were burnt to death when two motorcyclists hurled an explosive device at their van. Another Rector, Yousuf Ludhianvi, was shot dead by gunmen in Karachi on 18 May 2000. Mufti Nizamuddin Shamzai, the then head of the madrassa, was killed on 30 May 2004 when armed men ambushed his vehicle in front of the Binori Mosque. On 9 October 2004, another associated scholar, Jameel Ahmad Khan, was killed when his vehicle was fired upon by two gunmen on motorcycles. On 13 May 2012, Aslam Sheikhupuri was killed when gunmen on two motorcycles shot at his car. He had been associated with the school for 25 years.

Notable alumni
Maulana Abdullah Ghazi, first imam of Lal Masjid and founder of Jamia Faridia
Masood Azhar, leader of Jaish-e-Mohammed (JeM)
Asim Umar, leader of Al-Qaeda in the Indian subcontinent (AQIS)
Qari Saifullah Akhtar, was an alleged member of Al-Qaeda founder & leader of Harkat-ul-Jihad al-Islami (HuJI)
Azam Tariq, leader of Sipah-e-Sahaba Pakistan (SSP)
Fazlur Rehman Khalil, leader of Harkat-ul-Mujahideen (HuM)
Aurangzaib Farooqi, leader of Ahle Sunnat Wal Jama'at (ASWJ).
 Abdul Aziz Ghazi, leader of Lal Masjid (Red Mosque) and Chancellor of Jamia Faridia
Abdolmalek Rigi, leader of Jundallah
Mullah Omar, founding leader of the Taliban (Islamic Emirate of Afghanistan), did not study there, but was granted an honorary degree
Abdus Salam Chatgami, was a Bangladeshi Islamic scholar, educator, writer and researcher. For his research work, he was considered one of the prominent Islamic scholars of the Indian subcontinent.

See also
 Bayyinat
 Darul Uloom Haqqania
 Jamia Binoria

References

External links
 Official website

Islamic universities and colleges in Pakistan
Deobandi Islamic universities and colleges
Universities and colleges in Karachi
1954 establishments in Pakistan
Jamia Uloom-ul-Islamia